The Keuper Formation is a geologic formation in France. It preserves fossils dating back to the Triassic period.

See also

 List of fossiliferous stratigraphic units in France
 Keuper (a lithostratigraphic unit)

References
 

Triassic France